This is the discography of Hana Zagorová,  a popular Czech female singer, nine times listed number one in the national Zlaty Slavík ("Golden Nightingale") popularity chart.

Music

1968 Hana Zagorová - SP
Supraphon, SU 430 489
 Svatej kluk
 Jsem bláhová (Marie Rottrová only)

1968 Hana Zagorová - SP
Supraphon, SU 430 488
 Prý jsem zhýralá
 Dinda

1968 Hana Zagorová - SP
Supraphon, SU 430 535
 Jsou v blátivý cestě koleje
 Cyganicha

1968 Hana Zagorová - SP
Supraphon, SU 430 566
 Poslední šantán
 Obraz smutný slečny

1968 Hana Zagorová - SP
Supraphon, SU 430 654
 Honey (Honey)
 Mrtvá láska

1968 Hana Zagorová - SP
Supraphon, SU 430 717
 Zlá dáma
 Monolog

1968 Various Artists - Beat Line (LP)
Supraphon, SU 130 525
 Svatej kluk

1968 Various Artists - Zlatý Slavík (LP)
Supraphon, SU 130 636
 Obraz smutný slečny

1969 Various Artists - Boublík: Klub Dokonalé Zdravovědy Jana Boublíka ze Žlutic (LP)
Supraphon, SU 113 0809
 Jean
 Kočičí slabikář
 Motýlí žal
 Dům svalové ztuhlosti (w/Viktor Sodoma, Jiří Štědroň)

1969 Hana Zagorová - SP
Supraphon, SU 430 752
 Písmo maličký
 Tisíc nových jmen

1969 Hana Zagorová - SP
Supraphon, SU 430 831
 Bludička Julie
 Rokle

1969 Hana Zagorová - SP
Supraphon, SU 430 835
 Miláček
 Verbíř

1969 Hana Zagorová - SP
Supraphon, SU 430 873
 Zum zum zum
 Černý pasažér

1969 Various Artists - 2. ČS Beat Line (LP)
Supraphon, SU 130 607
 I say a little prayer for you
 Chain of fools

1969 Various Artists - VIII. Album Supraphonu (LP)
Supraphon, SU 130 688
 Poslední šantán

1970 Hana Zagorová - SP
Supraphon, SU 430 936
 O.K.
 Znám krásný přísloví

1970 Hana Zagorová - SP
Supraphon, SU 430 953
 Bílou křídou
 Budeš zase lhát

1970 Hana Zagorová - SP
Supraphon, SU 431 061
 Kočičí slabikář
 Jean

1970 Hana Zagorová - SP
Supraphon, SU 431 078
 Venuše (Venus)
 Piknik

1970 Hana Zagorová - SP
Supraphon, SU 431 148
 Gvendolína
 Nemám ráda

1971 Hana Zagorová - Bludička (LP)
Supraphon, SU 113 0910
 Tisíc nových jmen
 Papá Benjamin
 Podivín
 Básník a já
 Řeka v mém pokoji
 To bylo léto bláznivý
 Bludička Julie
 Bloumat po neznámým pobřeží
 Zlej kámen
 Devět poupat
 Tanečnice
 Rozhledna

1971 Hana Zagorová - SP
Supraphon, SU 431 205
 Já jsem tvá neznámá
 Koho tlačí můra

1971 Hana Zagorová - SP
Supraphon, SU 431 233
 Pan Tydlitýt a pan Tydlidát
 Nádraží v městečku M.

1971 Various Artists - 12 na Rok (LP)
Supraphon, SU 131 096
 Gvendolína

1971 Various Artists - IX. Album Supraphonu (LP)
Supraphon, SU 130 984
 Bludička Julie

1972 Hana Zagorová - Bludička Julie Hany Zagorové (MC)
Supraphon, SU 8130 138
 Bludička Julie
 Znám krásný přísloví
 Tisíc nových jmen
 Písmo maličký
 Nemám ráda
 Gvendolína
 Já jsem tvá neznámá
 Nádraží v městečku M.
 Koho tlačí můra
 Až já budu bohatá
 Pan Tydlitýt a pan Tydlidát
 Sliby-chyby

1972 Hana Zagorová - SP
Supraphon, SU 431 299
 Až já budu bohatá
 Sliby-chyby

1972 Various Artists - Supraphon Hity '72 (LP)
Supraphon, SU 899 859
 Já jsem tvá neznámá

1972 Various Artists - Zlatý Slavík 1971 (LP)
Supraphon, SU 1131 209
 Já jsem tvá neznámá

1972 Various Artists - Prague Pop Apostles (LP)
Supraphon, SU 1131 026
 Bludička Julie

1973 Hana Zagorová - SP
Supraphon, SU 431 451
 Malej Vilibald (Little Villi)
 Fatamorgana

1973 Hana Zagorová - SP
Supraphon, SU 431 493
 Mám, co mám
 Náš dům zní smíchem

1973 Hana Zagorová - SP
Supraphon, SU 431 568
 Tak si běž
 On je někdo

1973 Various Artists - Schlagersteine aus Prag (LP)
Supraphon, SU 855 295
 Tanzendes Irrlicht
 Ich bin dein unbekanntes Gluck

1973 Various Artists - Kytice (3LP)
Supraphon, SU 1131 513-15
 Bludička
 Vodník

1973 Various Artists - Zlatý Slavík 1972 (LP)
Supraphon, SU 1131 366
 Až já budu bohatá

1974 Hana Zagorová - SP
Supraphon, SU 431 673
 Já znám ten balzám
 Já se vznáším

1974 Hana Zagorová - SP
Supraphon, SU 431 692
 Tvá žena Růžena
 Začnou hrát

1974 Hana Zagorová - SP
Supraphon, SU 431 709
 Skončil bál
 Kluk, na kterého můžu dát (Byla to glupa milosc)

1975 Hana Zagorová - SP
Supraphon, SU 431 809
 Víckrát nelez přes můj práh (I´ve Got Texas in my Heart)
 Štěstí

1975 Hana Zagorová - SP
Supraphon, SU 431 819
 Breviář lásky
 Noc je ještě příliš mladá

1975 Hana Zagorová - SP
Supraphon, SU 431 847
 Asi, asi (Honey, Honey) (w/Petr Rezek)
 Dávám kabát na věšák

1975 Hana Zagorová - SP
Supraphon, SU 431 882
 Kamarád
 Už se připozdívá

1975 Hana Zagorová - SP
Supraphon, SU 431 901
 Zima, zima, zima, zima
 Znám tvůj trik

1975 Hana Zagorová - SP
Supraphon, SU 431 934
 Svážu stuhou déšť
 Prý je mu líp

1975 Various Artists - 10/45 na '76 (LP)
Supraphon, SU 1930 405
 Řeka zázraků

1976 Hana Zagorová - Cesta ke Štěstí (LP)
Supraphon, SU 1113 1720 H
 Cesta ke štěstí
 Ať si šeptají
 Svět náš
 Prý je mu líp
 Řeka zázraků
 Soucit
 Studánko stříbrná
 Vlaštovčí hnízdo
 Kdo ví, kde usínáš a s kým
 Jsi mrtvá sezóna
 Když písně lžou

1976 Hana Zagorová - SP
Supraphon, SU 1431 961
 Já mám pár tónů
 Můj sen je touha žít (Vado via)

1976 Hana Zagorová - SP
Supraphon, SU 1432 005
 Žízeň (S.O.S.)
 Maluj zase obrázky

1976 Hana Zagorová - SP
Supraphon, SU 1432 016
 Když písně lžou
 Soucit

1976 Hana Zagorová - SP
Supraphon, SU 1432 023
 Louka vábí (Die Kunigunde)
 Byl to víc než přítel můj

1976 Hana Zagorová - SP
Supraphon, SU 1432 030
 Vánoční tajemství (w/Petr Rezek)
 A v noci bude mráz

1976 Various Artists - XV. Album Supraphonu (LP)
Supraphon, SU 1131 907
 Asi, asi (Honey, Honey) (w/Petr Rezek)

1976 Various Artists - Václav Hybš a Jeho Hosté (LP)
Supraphon, SU 1131 917
 Lojzo, Lojzku, Lojzíku 
 Pepi, ty jsi můj (w/L. Kozderková, M. Zahrynowská, H. Talpová, M. Voborníková)

1976 Various Artists - 30 Let N.P. Supraphon (LP)
Supraphon, SU 1131 969
 Bludička Julie

1976 Various Artists - Studio Supraphon 1 (LP)
Supraphon, SU 1132 123
 Bludička Julie

1977 Hana Zagorová - SP
Supraphon, SU 1432 081
 Oheň a struny
 Tak to jsem já

1977 Hana Zagorová - SP
Supraphon, SU 1432 088
 Málokdo ví (Sambario)
 Duhová víla (w/Petr Rezek)

1977 Hana Zagorová - SP
Supraphon, SU 1432 142
 Nevím, nevím
 Sám jsi šel

1977 Hana Zagorová - SP
Supraphon, SU 1432 155
 Telegram (Telegram)
 Jaká jsem

1977 Hana Zagorová - SP
Supraphon, SU 1432 030
 Vánoční tajemství (w/Petr Rezek)
 A v noci bude mráz

1977 Various Artists - Hvězdy Pop Music 18 (MC)
Supraphon, SU C49 18
 Studánko stříbrná
 Prý je mu líp

1977 Various Artists - Hvězdy Pop Music 20 (MC)
Supraphon, SU C51 20
 Řeka zázraků

1978 Hana Zagorová - SP
Supraphon, SU 1432 165
 Královnička
 Madam Currie (Michal Prokop only)

1978 Hana Zagorová - SP
Supraphon, SU 1432 175
 Láska zůstává
 Jen tak

1978 Hana Zagorová - SP
Supraphon, SU 1432 182
 Píseň labutí
 Dotazník (Rock Bottom) (w/Petr Rezek)

1978 Hana Zagorová - SP
Supraphon, SU 1432 206
 Pojď, kdo máš mě rád
 Teď, když mám kam jít (Jiří Štědron only)

1978 Hana Zagorová - SP
Supraphon, SU 1432 218
 Proč ti na tom tak záleží
 Zdá se

1978 Various Artists - Jezdec Formule Život (LP)
Supraphon, SU 1132 384
 Jezdec formule život

1979 Hana Zagorová - Tobě, Tebe, Ti (LP)
Supraphon, SU 1132 436
 Melodram
 Zdá se
 Snad nezapomněl
 Hani, nebuď jak malinká
 Nevím
 Čas nezralých malin
 Honey
 Baron Prášil
 Závrať
 Na pátou ránvej
 Tam, kam sokoli létají
 Kapky

1979 Hana Zagorová - Breviary of Love (LP)
Supraphon, SU 1113 2489
 Young love (Cesta ke štěstí)
 I´ve a pal (Kamarád)
 You drew portraits (Maluj zase obrázky)
 Some one who's meant for me
 Life's magic stream
 My little wishing well (Studánko Stříbrná)
 Rainbow fairy (Duhová víla) (w/Petr Rezek)
 You're just a memory (Jsi mrtvá sezóna)
 Breviary of love (Breviář lásky)
 He's better now (Prý je mu líp)
 The show must go on

1979 Various Artists - EP
Supraphon, SU 11 899 810
 Hranice světel a stínů (w/Petr Rezek)

1979 Hana Zagorová - SP
Supraphon, SU 1432 272
 Přítel čas
 Nejspíš nespíš

1979 Hana Zagorová - SP
Supraphon, SU 1432 293
 Ta pusa je tvá (Stumblin' in) (w/Petr Rezek)
 Kosmický sen

1979 Various Artists - Spívají Listy Bříz (LP)
Supraphon
 Kluk z 1.A

1979 Various Artists - XVIII. Album Supraphonu (LP)
Supraphon, SU 1132 565
 Telegram (Telegram)
 Zdá se

1979 Various Artists - Malovaný Džbánek (LP)
Supraphon
 Až já budu bohatá

1979 Various Artists - Hvězdolet 06 (LP)
Supraphon, SU 1132 516
 Co nás láká (w/H. Vondráčková, M. Rottrová, J. Korn, V. Neckář, J. Schellinger)
 Pojď, kdo máš mě rád
 Hej, dívky z Prahy 5 (w/Helena Vondráčková, Marie Rottrová)

1979 Various Artists - Koktail z PKO (LP)
Supraphon, SU 911 60929
 Zdá se

1979 Various Artists - Orchestr ČST Uvadí (LP)
Supraphon, SU 192 303 27
 Jestli se rozzlobím, budu zlá
 Bída

1980 Various Artists - Přátelská Setkání #1 (LP)
Supraphon, SU 1113 2758
 To, co bylo, neplatí
 Setkání
 Láska v desátém semestru

1980 Hana Zagorová - Oheň v Duši Mé (LP)
Supraphon, SU 1113 2738
 Líto, je mi líto
 Zásnuby
 Tam pod naší strání
 Srdce mé bláhové
 Bloudím mapou vzpomínek
 Povídej si se mnou, abych neplakala
 To jsi ty
 Perný den
 Víš, co je most
 Oheň
 Doktore, au
 Pane vrchní, platím
 Oheň v duši mé

1980 Hana Zagorová - SP
Supraphon, SU 11432 340
 Setkání (Incontro) (w/Drupi)
 Kam jsi to letět chtěl, ptáčku můj

1980 Hana Zagorová - SP
Supraphon, SU 11432 352
 Náskok
 Kdyby se vrátil čas

1980 Hana Zagorová - SP
Supraphon, SU 11432 407
 Rýmy (Save me)
 Láska v desátém semestru

1980 Hana Zagorová - SP
Supraphon, SU 11432 438
 Dávné lásky (w/Karel Gott)
 Benjamin

1980 Various Artists - Vzhůru k Výškám (LP)
Supraphon, SU 11 132 605
 Zdá se

1980 Various Artists - Haló, Tady Orchestr a Balet ČST (LP)
Supraphon, SU 11 132 708
 Bída

1981 Hana Zagorová - Střípky (LP)
Supraphon, SU 1113 2944 ZA
 Usnul nám, spí
 Nevěřím ti
 Benjamin
 Oceán
 Opona
 Píseň lásky tlampač z dáli hrál
 Setkání (Incontro) (w/Drupi)
 Lásko, amore (w/Juraj Kukura)
 Dvě žlutá kuřátka (Piano Jack and Dixieland) (w/Helena Vondráčková)
 Zákaz předjíždění (w/Petr Rezek)
 Vyhrát se dá (w/Jiří Korn)
 Dávné lásky (w/Karel Gott)

1981 Hana Zagorová - SP
Supraphon, SU 11432 473
 Diskohrátky (The Locomotion)
 Usnul nám, spí

1981 Hana Zagorová - SP
Supraphon, SU 11432 500
 Lásko, amore
 Nech brouka žít (Juraj Kukura only)

1981 Hana Zagorová - SP
Supraphon, SU 11432 535
 Pátek (Tuesday)
 Jablko sváru

1981 Various Artists - Hvězdy Pop Music 27 (MC)
Supraphon, SU C60 61
 Benjamin
 Vyhrát se dá (w/Jiří Korn)

1981 Various Artists - 13x Zdeněk Marat (LP)
Supraphon, SU 11 132 893
 Ty jsi jednoho dne přišel na můj práh

1981 Various Artists - Nádherná Přátelství (LP)
Supraphon, SU 11 139 948
 Mé lásky, to jsou svátky

1981 Various Artists - Benefice TORČ Praha-J. Vobruba (2LP)
Supraphon, SU 11 133 061-2
 On je někdo

1982 Hana Zagorová - Světlo a Stín (LP)
Supraphon, SU 1113 3070
 Láska je počasí
 Tak ty ses vrátil
 Biograf láska
 Jedu s vámi
 Jako zlatý déšť
 Narozeniny
 Stáří (Miss You Tonite)
 Příboj
 Anonym (My Old Pal)
 Počítadlo lásky (uncredited: Petr Kotvald, Stanislav Hložek)
 Ještě chvíli
 Žízeň po životě

1982 Hana Zagorová - SP
Supraphon, SU 11432 563
 Nápad (Everybody's Rockin´)
 Sloky trochu smutné lásky

1982 Hana Zagorová - SP
Supraphon, SU 11432 587
 Mimořádná linka (Praha - Tokio) (Japonese Boy)
 Počítadlo lásky

1982 Various Artists - Hvězdy Pop Music 28 (MC)
Supraphon, SU C60 62
 Pátek (Tuesday)
 Diskohrátky (The Locomotion)

1982 Various Artists - Písničky ze Studiu A (MC)
Supraphon, SU 192 303 93
 Půl štěstí
 Můj zůstaň

1983 Various Artists - Tisíckrát Vyprodáno (Přátelská Setkání #2) (LP)
Supraphon, SU 1113 3237 ZA
 Malování ve snu
 Auťák na lásku (w/Petr Kotvald, Stanislav Hložek)
 Počestní, nečestní
 Otvírání psaní
 Apríl (w/Karel Gott)

1983 Hana Zagorová - Mimořádná Linka (LP)
Supraphon, SU 1113 3347 ZA
 Diskohrátky (The Locomotion)
 Líto, je mi líto (Vendo tutto)
 Benjamin
 Já vím (Nie mehr...)
 Vím málo (She's Always a Woman)
 Proč nejsi větší (I am the Lady)
 Mimořádná linka (Praha - Tokio) (Japonese Boy)
 Ty nejsi zralý (Rosie) (w/Petr Kotvald, Stanislav Hložek)
 Usnul nám, spí
 Kosmický sen
 Kočičí píseň (The Old Gumbie Cat) (w/Petr Kotvald, Stanislav Hložek)
 Nápad (Everybody's Rockin´)

1983 Hana Zagorová - EP
Supraphon, SU 11 330 586
 Kostky jsou vrženy (w/Petr Kotvald, Stanislav Hložek)
 Biograf láska
 Černý páv (Hard To Say I'm Sorry) (w/Petr Kotvald, Stanislav Hložek)
 Proč nejsi větší (I am the Lady)

1983 Various Artists - Duhová Víla (Přátelská Setkání #3) (LP)
Supraphon, SU 1113 3420
 Modrý ostrov snů (w/Petr Kotvald, Stanislav Hložek)
 He's so shy (Buenaventura)
 Hej, mistře basů (Mr. Bass Man) (w/Karel Vágner)
 Můj den zítřejší (Out Here on my Own)
 Duhová víla (w/Petr Rezek)
 Koncert (w/Petr Kotvald, Stanislav Hložek)
 To by nebylo fér (I Found my Way Home) (w/Petr Kotvald, Stanislav Hložek)
 Bída

1983 Petr Kotvald, Stanislav Hložek - Holky z Naší Školky (LP)
Supraphon, SU 1113 3245
 Hej, taste (Mickey) (w/Petr Kotvald, Stanislav Hložek)
 Auťák na lásku (w/Petr Kotvald, Stanislav Hložek)

1983 Hana Zagorová - SP
Supraphon, SU 11432 736
 To by nebylo fér (I found my way home) (w/Petr Kotvald, Stanislav Hložek)
 Auťák na lásku (w/Petr Kotvald, Stanislav Hložek)

1983 Hana Zagorová - SP
Supraphon, SU 11432 811
 Buldok (Ping Pong) (w/Petr Kotvald, Stanislav Hložek)
 Dáme autu trochu pít

1983 Hana Zagorová - SP
Supraphon, SU 11432 689
 Spěchám (Queen of Hearts) (w/Petr Kotvald, Stanislav Hložek)
 Apríl (w/Karel Gott)

1983 Petr Rezek - Modrá Zem (LP)
Supraphon, SU 1113 3259
 Duhová víla (w/Petr Rezek)
 Ta pusa je tvá (Stumblin' in) (w/Petr Rezek)

1983 Various Artists - XXII. Album Supraphonu (LP)
Supraphon, SU 1113 3230
 Spěchám (Queen of Hearts) (w/Petr Kotvald, Stanislav Hložek)
 Příboj

1984 Hana Zagorová - EP
Supraphon, SU 11330 587
 Máj je máj (uncredited: Petr Kotvald, Stanislav Hložek)
 Hotel Avion (w/Petr Kotvald, Stanislav Hložek)
 Všichni jsme stejní
 Právo žít (Petr Kotvald, Stanislav Hložek only)

1984 Hana Zagorová - Co Stalo se, Stalo (LP)
Supraphon, SU 1113 3469 ZA
 Křižovatka 6
 Dneska už to vím (w/Petr Kotvald, Stanislav Hložek)
 Co ti brání v pousmání (uncredited: Petr Kotvald, Stanislav Hložek)
 Skála (w/Petr Kotvald, Stanislav Hložek)
 Co stalo se, stalo
 Stvořená k lásce (w/Petr Kotvald, Stanislav Hložek)
 Zvonková pouť
 Maják (To Love)
 Čas celou noc
 Ztracená
 Řekni třikrát lásko
 Už dlouho se mi zdáš
 Všichni jsme stejní

1984 Hana Zagorová - SP
Supraphon, SU 11432 845
 Polibek (w/Petr Kotvald, Stanislav Hložek)
 Dneska už to vím (w/Petr Kotvald, Stanislav Hložek)

1984 Hana Zagorová - SP
Supraphon, SU 11432 920
 Jinak to nejde (Guardian Angel) (w/Petr Kotvald, Stanislav Hložek)
 Ahoj, léto (w/Petr Kotvald, Stanislav Hložek)

1984 Hana Zagorová - SP
Supraphon, SU 11432 926
 Kam jdou (Hello)
 Krásky (Petr Kotvald, Stanislav Hložek only)

1984 Hana Zagorová - SP
Supraphon, SU 11432 949
 Můj čas (w/Petr Kotvald, Stanislav Hložek)
 Sanitka (ORM only, instrumental)

1984 Various Artists - XXIII. Album Supraphonu (LP)
Supraphon, SU 11133 495
 Polibek (Piccolo Amore) (w/Petr Kotvald, Stanislav Hložek)
 To by nebylo fér (I found my way home) (w/Petr Kotvald, Stanislav Hložek)

1985 Various Artists - The Cinema of Stars (LP)
Supraphon, SU 1113 3840
 Queen of hearts (Spěchám) (w/Petr Kotvald, Stanislav Hložek)
 Take me for the ride tonight (Počítadlo lásky)
 Love car (Auťák na lásku) (w/Petr Kotvald, Stanislav Hložek)
 Cinema of love (Biograf láska)
 The locomotion (Diskohrátky)

1985 Hana Zagorová - Sítě Kroků Tvých (LP)
Supraphon, SU 1113 3740 ZA
 Hej
 Poslední z posledních
 Nic jí neschází (w/Petr Kotvald, Stanislav Hložek)
 Noční dopis
 Starosti
 Sláva, je bál (Niech žyje bal)
 Co mám ze své výhry
 Maxitaxi
 Nešlap, nelámej
 Zločin století
 Když svítím
 Ztracená píseň
 Sítě kroků tvých (Sulla tua pelle)

1985 Various Artists - SP
Supraphon, SU 11433 148
 Nejhezčí dárek 1. díl (w/Helena Vondráčková, Petr Kotvald, Stanislav Hložek, etc.)
 Nejhezčí dárek 2. díl (w/Iveta Bartošová, Michal David, Petra Janů, etc.)

1985 Hana Zagorová - Lávky (2LP)
Supraphon, SU 1113 4141-42 ZA

LP1
 Honey (Honey)
 Obraz smutný slečny
 Mrtvá láska
 Bludička Julie
 Gvendolína
 Breviář lásky
 Já jsem tvá neznámá
 Studánko stříbrná
 Cesta ke štěstí
 Tam pod naší strání
 Zdá se
 On je někdo
 Kdyby se vrátil čas
 Kamarád

LP2
 Maluj zase obrázky
 Duhová víla
 Líto, je mi líto (Vendo tutto)
 Málokdo ví (Sambario)
 Závrať
 Setkání
 Vím málo (She's Always a Woman)
 Počítadlo lásky
 Biograf láska
 Usnul nám, spí
 Nápad (Everybody's Rockin´)
 Černý páv (Hard To Say I'm Sorry) (w/Petr Kotvald, Stanislav Hložek)
 Spěchám (Queen of Hearts) (w/Petr Kotvald, Stanislav Hložek)

1985 Hana Zagorová, Petr Kotvald, Stanislav Hložek - Jinak To Nejde (LP)
Supraphon, SU 1113 3844
 Nešlap, nelámej
 Přání (w/Stanislav Hložek)
 Až budou kytky umět psát
 Jinak to nejde (Guardian Angel) (w/Petr Kotvald, Stanislav Hložek)
 Má pohádková země
 Lásko kolem nás
 Kdo má rád (I Don't Want to Talk About It)

1985 Various Artists - Dvanáct Sezón (LP)
Supraphon, SU 1113 3570
 V průvanu (w/Petr Kotvald, Stanislav Hložek)
 Kluk z příštího století (Almost Paradise) (w/Stanislav Hložek)
 Mám tě ráda, jsi přítel můj (w/Petr Kotvald, Stanislav Hložek, VOX, etc.)

1985 Petr Kotvald, Stanislav Hložek - Pro Dva Tři Úsměvy (LP)
Supraphon, SU 1113 3739
 Pro dva tři úsměvy (w/Petr Kotvald, Stanislav Hložek)

1985 Hana Zagorová - SP
Supraphon, SU 11432 986
 Džínovej kluk (Girls Just Want to Have Fun)
 Potulní kejklíři (w/Petr Kotvald, Stanislav Hložek)

1985 Hana Zagorová - SP
Supraphon, SU 11433 012
 Hej, mistře basů (Mr. Bass Man) (w/Karel Vágner)
 Nic jí neschází (w/Petr Kotvald, Stanislav Hložek)

1985 Hana Zagorová - SP
Supraphon, SU 11433 028
 Kluk z příštího století (Almost Paradise) (w/Stanislav Hložek)
 Mám tě ráda, jsi přítel můj (w/Petr Kotvald, Stanislav Hložek, VOX, etc.)

1985 Hana Zagorová - SP
Supraphon, SU 11433 070
 Co já vím (w/Karel Gott)
 Má pohádková země

1985 Hana Zagorová - SP
Supraphon, SU 11433 083
 Letní kluci
 Ztracená píseň

1985 Hana Zagorová - SP
Supraphon, SU 11433 148
 Nešlap, nelámej
 Je tu doba dešťů

1985 Various Artists - Hvězdy Pop Music 33 (MC)
Supraphon, SU C60 75
 Pátek (Tuesday)
 Diskohrátky (The Locomotion)

1985 Various Artists - Písničky z Obrazovky (LP)
Supraphon, SU 1113 3094
 Auťák na lásku (w/Petr Kotvald, Stanislav Hložek)

1985 Various Artists - Praha-Moskva 1985 (LP)
Supraphon, SU 1113 3856
 Biograf láska

1985 Various Artists - Mys Dobrých Nadějí (LP)
Supraphon, SU 1113 3870
 Mys dobrých nadějí
 Co stalo se, stalo

1985 Various Artists - Tip Top 1 (LP)
Supraphon, SU 1113 3787
 Můj čas

1986 Various Artists - Naše Láska Ztrácí L (LP)
Supraphon, SU 1113 4367
 Psáno láskou
 Óda na život
 Naše láska ztrácí L
 Velikánský umění (w/Stanislav Hložek)

1986 Hana Zagorová - Náhlá Loučení (LP)
Supraphon, SU 113 3949 ZA
 Náhlá loučení
 Jako nemluvně
 Já ti mávám (w/Karel Vágner)
 Druhá láska
 Byl jsi tak jiný
 Sbohem, dobrá firmo
 Jízda
 Neříkej mi
 Láska na inzerát
 Touhy
 Tvá kočka
 Už se mi nechce jít dál

1986 Hana Zagorová - SP
Supraphon, SU 1143 3141
 Já o něm vím své (I Know Him So Well) (w/Petra Janů)
 Jízda

1986 Hana Zagorová - SP
Supraphon, SU 1143 3176
 Tu, tu (w/Petr Kotvald, Stanislav Hložek)
 Zlato

1986 Hana Zagorová - SP
Supraphon, SU 1143 3289
 Naše láska ztrácí L
 Velikánský umění (w/Stanislav Hložek)

1986 Hana Zagorová - SP
Supraphon, SU 1143 3305
 Dobré jitro
 Jako nemluvně

1986 Hana Zagorová - SP
Supraphon, SU 1143 3331
 Uspávanka
 Vem si kousek vůně (I. Snopková only)

1986 Hana Zagorová - SP
Supraphon, SU 1143 3227
 Jen jedenkrát v roce (Einmal im Winter) (w/Petr Kotvald, Stanislav Hložek)
 Já přišel přát (Stanislav Hložek only)

1986 Petr Kotvald, Stanislav Hložek - Feeling Good (LP)
Supraphon, SU 103990 1311
 Love Car (Auťák na lásku) (w/Petr Kotvald, Stanislav Hložek)
 My time (Můj čas) (w/Petr Kotvald, Stanislav Hložek)

1986 Stanislav Hložek - Za To Může Déšť, Ne Já (LP)
Supraphon, SU 1113 3948
 Velikánský umění (w/Stanislav Hložek)

1986 Various Artists - Nejhezčí Dárek (LP)
Supraphon, SU 1113 4368
 Naše láska ztrácí L
 Už se mi nechce jít dál
 Nejhezčí dárek (w/various artists)

1986 Various Artists - Tip Top 2 (LP)
Supraphon, SU 1113 3788
 Nešlap, nelámej
 Jinak to nejde (Guardian Angel) (w/Petr Kotvald, Stanislav Hložek)

1986 Various Artists - XXIV. Album Supraphonu (LP)
Supraphon, SU 1113 4079
 Můj čas (w/Petr Kotvald, Stanislav Hložek)
 Letní kluci

1986 Various Artists - Biograf Láska (MC)
Supraphon, SU C60 72
 Biograf láska

1986 Various Artists - Breviář Lásky-Písně Jiřího Zmožka 2 (MC)
Supraphon, SU C60 55
 Křižovatka 6
 Nešlap, nelámej
 Breviář lásky

1986 Various Artists - 20 Nej... #9 (MC)
Supraphon, SU 192 339 99
 Nic jí neschází (w/Petr Kotvald, Stanislav Hložek)

1986 Various Artists - 20 Nej... #10 (MC)
Supraphon, SU 192 340 00
 Nešlap, nelámej

1986 Various Artists - Dálnice (MC)
Supraphon, SU 192 340 16
 Spěchám (Queen of Hearts) (w/Petr Kotvald, Stanislav Hložek)
 Dáme autu trochu pít

1986 Various Artists - Diskohrátky Pionýrské Vlaštovky (LP)
Supraphon
 Biograf láska

1987 Various Artists - Speciál Team (LP)
Supraphon, SU 1113 4199
 Kousek cesty s tebou
 Dáma s diplomem
 Tam, kde schází terminál (w/Stanislav Hložek)

1987 Various Artists - Dluhy Hany Zagorové (LP)
Supraphon, SU 1113 4184
 Je tu doba dešťů
 Starci na chmelu (w/Petr Kotvald, Stanislav Hložek)
 Hany s ofinou (w/Vlastimil Harapes)
 Kontakt (w/Petr Kotvald, Stanislav Hložek)
 Zlato
 Vlaštovčí hnízdo (w/Karel Gott, Vlastimil Harapes)
 Udělej si prima den (w/Stanislav Hložek)

1987 Hana Zagorová - SP
Supraphon, SU 1143 3363
 Kousek cesty s tebou
 Tam, kde schází terminál (w/Stanislav Hložek)

1987 Hana Zagorová - SP
Supraphon, SU 1143 3463
 Živá voda
 Jako jindy

1987 Hana Zagorová - SP
Supraphon, SU 1143 3499
 Mám plán
 Skleněné sny

1987 Hana Zagorová - SP
Supraphon, SU 1143 3510
 Boty proti lásce
 Chvíli jsem balónem

1987 Various Artists - Kousek Cesty s Tebou (LP)
Supraphon, SU 1113 4438
 Kousek cesty s tebou
 Slušných lidí je víc (w/Stanislav Hložek)

1987 Various Artists - XXV. Album Supraphonu (LP)
Supraphon, SU 1113 4244
 Kousek cesty s tebou

1987 Various Artists - ECHO (LP)
Supraphon, SU 1113 4199
 Velikánský umění (w/Stanislav Hložek)

1988 Hana Zagorová - Živá Voda (LP, CD)
Supraphon, SU 1113 4183
 Srážka s láskou
 Větroplach
 Už si nevzpomínám
 S loudilem v patách
 Skleněné sny
 Chvíli jsem balónem
 Bourá se dům (w/Jan Neckář)
 Drápkem se zachytím
 Smiřování
 Jako jindy
 Zemětřesení
 Velká krádež
 Živá voda

1988 Various Artists - Šmoulové (LP)
Supraphon, SU 110317 1311
 Šmoulová země
 Šmoulí song (w/Stanislav Hložek, Jiří Korn, Darina Rolincová, Karel Gott, etc.)

1988 Various Artists - Dny Jdou (LP)
Supraphon, SU 110152 1311
 Zpráva všem holubům

1988 Hana Zagorová - SP
Supraphon, SU 110082 7311
 Jsou tu lidi
 Zpráva všem holubům

1988 Hana Zagorová - SP
Supraphon, SU 110197 7311
 Šmoulová země
 Pracovní šou (Petra Janů only)

1988 Various Artists - Malovaný Večírek (LP)
Supraphon, SU 110147 1311
 Nešlap, nelámej
 Živá voda

1988 Various Artists - Jasná Zpráva (LP)
Supraphon, SU 110071 1311
 Narozeniny

1988 Various Artists - Karel Svoboda: Písně a Filmové Melodie 1966-88 (2LP)
Supraphon, SU 110315 1312/110316 1312
 Gvendolína
 Studánko stříbrná

1988 Richard Müller - V Penzionu Svet (LP)
Supraphon, SU 104236 1311
 Milostný dopis Haně Z. (w/Richard Müller)

1989 Hana Zagorová - SP
Supraphon, SU 110251 7311
 Rybičko zlatá, přeju si
 Modrá čajovna

1989 Various Artists - Vaprávění o Šmoulech (LP)
Supraphon, re-release, SU 110592 1811
 Šmoulová země
 Šmoulí song (w/Stanislav Hložek, Jiří Korn, Darina Rolincová, Karel Gott, etc.)

1989 Various Artists - Jambo Karla Vágnera (LP)
Supraphon, SU 110432 1311
 Já nevím jak
 Modrá čajovna

1989 Various Artists - XXVI. Album Supraphonu (LP)
Supraphon, SU 110175 1311
 Skleněné sny

1989 Various Artists - Hity '89 (CD)
N/A, 710 665-2
 Rybičko zlatá, přeju si

1989 Richard Müller - V Penzionu Svet (CD)
Supraphon, SU 104236 2311
 Milostný dopis Haně Z. (w/Richard Müller)

1990 Various Artists - Tom a Jerry (LP)
Miltisonic, 310002 1311
 Tom a Jerry

1990 Various Artists - Šmoulové a Gargamel (LP)
Supraphon, SU 110848 1311
 Kočičí svátek - Asrael

1990 Hana Zagorová - Dnes Nejsem Doma (LP)
Supraphon, SU 110149 1311 ZA
 Andělé
 Modrá čajovna
 A kdo jsem já
 Měsíc je den ode dne krásnější
 Dnes nejsem doma
 Podivný bar
 Buď vůle tvá (Where is it Written?)
 Rybičko zlatá, přeju si
 Půlnoc
 Kufr
 Stíny
 Čas odejít

1990 Hana Zagorová - SP
Supraphon, SU 110403 7311
 Beránek (Koleda s pretensjami)
 Skanzen bídy

1990 Various Artists - XXVII. Album Supraphonu (LP)
Supraphon, SU 110478 1311
 Rybičko zlatá, přeju si

1990 Various Artists - Křesťanské Songy a Podobenství (LP)
Multisonic, 310001 1311
 Přichází doba tajných přání

1991 Hana Zagorová - Rozhovor v Tichu (LP, CD)
Multisonic, LP 310117 1311, CD 310117 2311
 Rozhovor v tichu
 Křest ohněm
 Merilyn
 Vzdálení (Every Time You Say Good-bye)
 Vím, že se díváš
 Neznámé zálivy
 Jako starý strom
 Říční kámen
 Moře samoty
 Žena za tvými zády
 Obraz
 Neodcházej

1991 Hana Zagorová - SP
Multisonic, #310068 7311
 Pěšáci z front
 Jako starý strom

1991 Hana Zagorová - SP
Multisonic, #310102 7311
 Pofoukej mi jahody
 S.O.S. blues (Karel Černoch only)

1991 Various Artists - XXVIII. Album Supraphonu (LP)
Supraphon, SU 110861 1311
 Modrá čajovna

1991 Various Artists - Písničky z Rosy (CD)
Mutisonic, #3101151 2331
 Tom a Jerry

1992 Various Artists - Želvy Ninja (CD)
Multisonic, #310177 2331
 Pět mušketýrů

1992 Various Artists - 46 Hitů K. Svobody (2CD)
N/A, #111756 2312
 Gvendolína
 Studánko stříbrná

1992 Various Artists - Staň se Růží (CD)
N/A, #111773 2311
 Já chtěla jsem ti báseň psát

1993 Various Artists - Písničky pro Barbie (CD)
Tommü Records, #310165 2331
 Máš, co nemá žádná
 Prvně sama

1993 Various Artists - Hity 1974 (CD)
N/A, #111670 2331
 Já se vznáším

1993 Various Artists - Hity 1984 (CD)
N/A, #111758 2331
 Jinak to nejde (Guardian Angel) 1984 (w/Petr Kotvald, Stanislav Hložek)

1993 Various Artists - Dimantová Deska (Ladislav Štaidl) (CD)
N/A, #112525 2312
 Když písně lžou

1993 Various Artists - Tip Top Gold 70 (CD)
N/A, #111753 2331
 Duhová víla (w/Petr Rezek)

1994 Hana Zagorová - Když Nemůžu Spát (CD)
Tommü Records, total time: 41:46, TR 610075-4331, AAD/ADD stereo
 Kdo ví, kde usínáš 1993
 Přijď aspoň na chvíli 1993 (w/Boris Rösner)
 Den jako obrázek 1993 (w/Helena Růžičková)
 Padám, když svítá 1994
 Hra na pravdu 1993 (w/Dáša Veškrnová)
 Mží 1994 (w/Karel Gott)
 Jen já a sen 1994
 Hej, mistře basů (Mr. Bass Man) 1983 (w/Karel Vágner)
 Já o něm vím své (I Know Him so Well) 1985 (w/Petra Janů)
 Noční dopis 1994
 Lítat jako pták 1994 (w/Michal David)
 Ave Maria 1994 (w/Štefan Margita)

1994 Hana Zagorová, Štefan Margita - Ave (CD)
Multisonic
 Ave Maria
 Chválím den sváteční
 Tvá hvězda vánoční
 Bože, tohle jsi chtěl
 Směs vánočních koled
 Kdo se zítra narodíš
 Jen jedenkrát v roce
 Směs vánočních koled II

1994 Various Artists - Písničky z Rosy 3 (CD)
Multisonic, #310260 2331
 Pofoukej mi jahody
 Malý ponny
 Zlatovláska

1994 Various Artists - Poníkové Království (CD)
N/A, #610076 2331
 Poník Špína
 Poníkové království

1994 Various Artists - Želvy Ninja 2 (CD)
Multisonic
 Mutagenní ukolébavka

1994 Various Artists - Hity 1968 (CD)
N/A, #111579 2331
 Obraz smutný slečny

1994 Various Artists - Hity 1969 (CD)
N/A, #111581 2331
 Bludička Julie

1994 Various Artists - Hity 1971 (CD)
N/A, #111591 2331
 Já jsem tvá neznámá

1994 Various Artists - Hity 1972 (CD)
N/A, #112600 2331
 Náš dům zní smíchem
 Sliby, chyby

1995 Hana Zagorová - Maluj Zase Obrázky (CD)
Multisonic
 Maluj zase obrázky
 Biograf láska
 Nápad
 Nešlap, nelámej
 Já se vznáším
 Usnul nám, spí
 Spěchám
 Studánko stříbrná
 Zdá se
 Málokdo ví
 Cesta ke štěstí
 Duhová víla
 Honey
 Jinak to nejde

1996 Hana Zagorová - Maluj Zase Obrázky II (CD)
Multisonic
 Kdyby se vrátil čas
 Gvendolína
 Sloky trochu smutné lásky
 Modrá čajovna
 Mys dobrých nadějí
 Hej, mistře basů
 To by nebylo fér
 Beránek
 Černý páv
 Kapky
 Náš dům zní smíchem
 Co stalo se, stalo
 Rybičko zlatá, přeju si
 Zásnuby
 On je někdo
 Sláva, je bál

1996 Hana Zagorová, Štefan Margita - Ave II (CD)
Multisonic
 Svítíš mi v tmách
 Kdybych byla Bůh
 V mém království
 Kdyby se vrátil čas
 On je někdo
 Roční období
 Noc dávných přání

1996 Hana Zagorová - Gvendolína 1968-1971 (CD)
Bonton Music, total time: 73:11, BON 71-0503-2, AAD stereo
 Pro panenku 1968
 Písnička v bílém 1968
 Kouzelný obraz 1968
 Poslední šantán 1968
 Dinda 1968
 Obraz smutný slečny 1968    
 Cyganicha 1968
 Jsou v blátivé cestě koleje (Wendowanie) 1968
 Znám krásný přísloví 1969
 Honey (Honey) 1969
 Zum zum zum 1969
 Miláček (Celui que j'aime) 1969
 Monolog 1969
 Písmo maličký 1969
 Mrtvá láska 1969
 Černý pasažér 1969
 Verbíř 1969
 Rokle 1969
 Pan Tydlitýt a pan Tydlitát (Tweedle Dee-Tweedle Dum) 1971
 Nádraží v městečku M. 1971
 Nemám ráda (Quieres la falicidad, o no) 1971
 Já jsem tvá neznámá 1971
 Koho tlačí múra (It's Up to You) 1971
 Gvendolína 1971

1997 Hana Zagorová - Bludička Julie (CD)
Bonton Music, total time: 50:54, BON 71-0589-2, AAD stereo
 Bludička Julie 1969
 Bloumat po neznámým pobřeží 1970
 Zlej kámen 1970
 Devět poupat 1970
 Tanečnice 1970
 Rozhledna 1970
 Tisíc nových jmen 1969
 Papá Benjamin 1970
 Podivín 1970
 Básník a já 1970
 Řeka v mém pokoji 1970
 To bylo léto bláznivý 1970
 Jean 1969
 Kočičí slabikář 1969
 Motýlí žal 1969
 Dům svalové ztuhlosti 1969

1998 Hana Zagorová, Petr Kotvald, Stanislav Hložek - Jinak to Nejde (CD)
Bonton Music, total time: 75:10, BON 491524-2, AAD stereo
 Potulní kejklíři 1985 (w/Petr Kotvald, Stanislav Hložek)
 Ahoj, léto 1984 (w/Petr Kotvald, Stanislav Hložek)
 Hotel Avion 1984 (w/Petr Kotvald, Stanislav Hložek)
 V průvanu 1984 (w/Petr Kotvald, Stanislav Hložek)
 Kostky jsou vrženy (Monte Carlo is Great) 1983 (w/Petr Kotvald, Stanislav Hložek)
 Máj je máj (My oh My) 1984 (uncredited: Petr Kotvald, Stanislav Hložek)
 Hej, taste (Mickey) 1983 (w/Petr Kotvald, Stanislav Hložek)
 Pro dva tři úsměvy 1985 (w/Petr Kotvald, Stanislav Hložek)
 Jinak to nejde (Guardian Angel) 1984 (w/Petr Kotvald, Stanislav Hložek)
 Starci na chmelu 1986 (w/Petr Kotvald, Stanislav Hložek)
 Diskohrátky (The locomotion) 1981
 Modrý ostrov snů 1983 (w/Petr Kotvald, Stanislav Hložek)
 Spěchám (Queen of Hearts) 1982 (w/Petr Kotvald, Stanislav Hložek)
 To by nebylo fér (I'll Find my Way Home) 1983 (w/Petr Kotvald, Stanislav Hložek)
 Tam, kde schází terminál 1986 (w/Stanislav Hložek)
 Polibek (Piccolo amore) 1984 (w/Petr Kotvald, Stanislav Hložek)
 Nic jí neschází 1985 (w/Petr Kotvald, Stanislav Hložek)
 Buldok (Ping Pong) 1983 (w/Petr Kotvald, Stanislav Hložek)
 Džínovej kluk (Girls Just Want to Have Fun) 1984
 Černý páv (Hard to Say I'm Sorry) 1983 (w/Petr Kotvald, Stanislav Hložek)
 Můj čas 1984 (w/Petr Kotvald, Stanislav Hložek)
 Jen jedenkrát v roce (Einmal im Winter) 1986 (w/Petr Kotvald, Stanislav Hložek)

1998 Hana Zagorová - Já? (CD)
Multisonic
 Je t'aime
 Když tě ztrácím
 Já chtěla jsem ti báseň psát
 Dny dětství
 Na co já tě mám
 Když jsem vedle tebe
 Prosím
 Byl to víc než přítel můj
 Torza nadějí
 Přítel splín
 Slova řeknou málo
 Podzim má mě rád

1998 Hana Zagorová - Cesta ke Štěstí / Tobě, Tebe, Ti (CD)
Bonton Music, total time: 71:05, BON 491044-2, AAD stereo
 Cesta ke štěstí 1975
 Svět náš 1975
 Prý je mu líp 1975
 Řeka zázraků 1975
 Soucit 1975
 Studánko stříbrná 1975
 Vlaštovčí hnízdo 1975
 Kdo ví, kde usínáš a s kým 1975
 Jsi mrtvá sezóna 1975
 Když písně lžou 1975
 Melodram 1978
 Zdá se 1977
 Nevím 1978
 Čas nezralých malin 1978
 Honey 1978
 Baron Prášil 1978
 Závrať 1978
 Na pátou ránvej 1978
 Tam, kam sokoli létají 1978
 Kapky 1978

1999 Hana Zagorová - Oheň v Duši Mé / Střípky (CD)
Bonton Music, total time: 72:32, BON 493156-2, AAD stereo
 Líto, je mi líto (Vendo tutto) 1980
 Zásnuby 1980
 Tam pod naší strání 1980
 Srdce mé bláhové 1980
 Bloudím mapou vzpomínek 1980
 Povídej si se mnou, abych neplakala 1980
 Víš, co je most 1980
 Oheň 1980
 Doktore, au 1980
 Pane vrchní, platím 1980
 Oheň v duši mé 1980
 Usnul nám, spí 1981
 Nevěřím ti 1981
 Benjamin 1981
 Oceán 1981
 Opona 1981
 Píseň lásky tlampač z dáli hrál 1981
 Setkání 1979 (w/Drupi)
 Lásko, amore 1979 (w/Juraj Kukura)
 Dvě žlutá kuřátka (Piano Jack and Dixieland) 1978 (w/Helena Vondráčková)
 Vyhrát se dá 1981 (w/Jiří Korn)
 Dávné lásky 1980 (w/Karel Gott)

1999 Michal David - Pár Přátel Stačí Mít (CD)
Sony BMG
 Romeo a Giulietta

2000 Hana Zagorová - Modrá Čajovna (CD)
Multisonic
 Modrá čajovna
 Dneska už to vím
 Zpráva všem holubům
 Chvíli jsem balónem
 Stíny
 Jízda
 Pěšáci z front
 Jaká jsem
 Benjamin
 Duhová víla
 Zlato
 Usnul nám, spí
 Jako jindy
 Pofoukej mi jahody
 Počítadlo lásky
 Ahoj, léto
 Dáme autu trochu pít
 Je tu doba dešťů
 Když jsem vedle tebe

2000 Hana Zagorová - Světlo a Stín (CD)
Bonton Music, total time: 75:24, BON 495384-2, AAD stereo
 Láska je počasí 1982
 Tak ty ses vrátil 1982
 Biograf láska 1982
 Jedu s vámi 1982
 Jako zlatý déšť 1982
 Narozeniny 1982
 Stáří (Miss You Tonite) 1982
 Příboj 1982
 Anonym (My Old Pal) 1982
 Počítadlo lásky 1982 (uncredited: Petr Kotvald, Stanislav Hložek)
 Ještě chvíli 1982
 Žízeň po životě 1982
 Dáme autu trochu pít 1981
 Múj zústaň 1982
 Púl štěstí 1982
 Apríl 1982 (w/Karel Gott)
 Malování ve snu 1982
 Počestní,nečestní 1982
 Otvírání psaní 1982
 Múj den zítřejší (Out Here on my Own) 1983
 Bída 1983
 Mám tě ráda, jsi přítel múj 1984 (w/Petr Kotvald, Stanislav Hložek, VOX, etc.)

2000 Various Artists - Písničky pro Děti (CD)
Multisonic
 Silly song (also known as Sněhurka a 7 trpaslíků)
 Koncert

2001 Hana Zagorová - Mimořádná Linka (CD)
Bonton Music, total time: 75:52, BON 499741-2, AAD stereo
 Diskohrátky (The locomotion) 1981
 Líto, je mi líto (Vendo tutto) 1980
 Benjamin 1980
 Já vím (Nie mehr...) 1982
 Vím málo 1983
 Proč nejsi větší (I am the Lady) 1982
 Mimořádná linka (Praha - Tokio) (Japanese Boy) 1982
 Ty nejsi zralý (Rosie) 1982 (w/Petr Kotvald, Stanislav Hložek)
 Usnul nám, spí 1981
 Kosmický sen 1979
 Kočičí píseň (The Old Gumbie Cat) 1981 (w/Petr Kotvald, Stanislav Hložek)
 Nápad (Everybody's Rockin') 1982
 Černý páv (Hard to Say I'm Sorry) 1983 (w/Petr Kotvald, Stanislav Hložek)
 Máj je máj (My oh My) 1983 (uncredited: Petr Kotvald, Stanislav Hložek)
 Kam jdou (Hello) 1984
 Jen pár dnů (Cosa sei) 1984 (w/Vlastimil Harapes)
 Mys dobrých nadějí 1984
 Džínovej kluk (Girls Just Want to Have Fun) 1984
 Já o něm vím své (I Know Him so Well) 1985 (w/Petra Janů)
 Jízda 1985
 Kluk z příštího století (Almost Paradise) 1984 (w/Stanislav Hložek)

2001 Hana Zagorová - Hanka (CD)
Multisonic
 Dopis na rozloučenou
 Zůstaň tady léto
 To přece není náhodou
 Je naprosto nezbytné
 Když jsi se mnou
 Ode zdi ke zdi
 Blahovolně
 Pokušení
 Nebylo by, kdyby
 Závist
 Když vcházíš ránem
 Za každou chvíli s tebou platím
 Skleněný dům
 Čas
 Dopis na rozloučenou II

2001 Helena Vondráčková - Paprsky / Múzy (2CD)
Bonton Music
 Život je jen náhoda

2001 Various Artists - Zlaté Duety (CD)
 Ta pusa je tvá (w/Petr Rezek)
 Duhová víla (w/Petr Rezek)
 Apríl (w/Karel Gott)

2001 Hana Zagorová - Co Stalo se, Stalo (CD)
Bonton Music, total time: 76:37, BON 504190-2, AAD stereo
 Křižovatka 6 1984
 Dneska už to vím 1984 (w/Petr Kotvald, Stanislav Hložek)
 Co ti brání v pousmání 1984 (uncredited: Petr Kotvald, Stanislav Hložek)
 Skála 1984 (w/Petr Kotvald, Stanislav Hložek)
 Co stalo se, stalo 1984
 Stvořená k lásce 1984 (w/Petr Kotvald, Stanislav Hložek)
 Zvonková pouť 1984
 Maják (To Love) 1984
 Čas celou noc 1984
 Ztracená 1984
 Řekni třikrát lásko 1984
 Už dlouho se mi zdáš 1984
 Všichni jsme stejní 1984
 Letní kluci 1985
 Je tu doba dešťů 1986
 Až budou kytky umět psát 1985
 Má pohádková země 1985
 Lásko kolem nás 1985
 Kdo má rád (I Don't Want to Talk About It) 1985
 Take me for the ride tonight (Počítadlo lásky) 1984
 Cinema of love (Biograf láska) 1984

2002 Helena Vondráčková - Sblížení (CD)
Bonton Music
 Dvě žlutá kuřátka

2003 Hana Zagorová - Navěky Zůstane Čas (CD)
Multisonic
 Navěky zůstane pouze čas
 Odvykám
 Smůlu máš
 Krev a šroubky
 Lásko vítej
 Jsi navždy zodpovědný
 Chlap je noc a ženská den
 Zlámané klíče
 Už pár dnů
 Co jsi zač?
 Že je mi líto
 Sfoukni půlměsíc

2003 Hana Zagorová - Největší Hity (Best of) (2CD)
Bonton Music, total time: 78:39 (CD1), 77:24 (CD2), BON 511012-2, AAD stereo

CD1
 Svatej kluk 1968
 Mrtvá láska 1968
 Obraz smutný slečny 1968
 Honey (Honey) 1969
 Tisíc nových jmen 1969
 Bludička Julie 1969
 Tanečnice 1970
 Gvendolína 1971
 On je někdo (You're a Lady) 1973
 Breviář lásky 1975
 Cesta ke štěstí 1975
 Dávám kabát na věšák 1975
 Studánko stříbrná 1975
 Maluj zase obrázky 1976
 Málokdo ví (Sambario) 1977
 Duhová víla 1977 (w/Petr Rezek)
 Zdá se 1977
 Ta pusa je tvá (Stumblin' in) 1979 (w/Petr Rezek)
 Kdyby se vrátil čas 1979
 Setkání 1979 (w/Drupi)
 Líto, je mi líto (Vendo tutto) 1980
 Oheň v duši mé 1980

CD2
 Lásko, amore 1981 (w/Juraj Kukura)
 Usnul nám, spí 1981
 Sloky trochu smutné lásky 1981
 Nápad (Everybody's Rockin') 1981
 Biograf láska 1982
 Spěchám (Queen of Hearts) 1982 (w/Petr Kotvald, Stanislav Hložek)
 To by nebylo fér (I'll Fimd my Way Home) 1983 (w/Petr Kotvald, Stanislav Hložek)
 Hej, mistře basů (Mr. Bass Man) 1983 (w/Karel Vágner)
 Vím málo (She's Always a Woman) 1983
 Co stalo se, stalo 1984
 Jinak to nejde (Guardian Angel) 1984 (w/Petr Kotvald, Stanislav Hložek)
 Můj čas 1984 (w/Petr Kotvald, Stanislav Hložek)
 Jen pár dnů (Cosa sei) 1984 (w/Vlastimil Harapes)
 Mys dobrých nadějí 1984
 Nešlap, nelámej 1985
 Bourá se dům 1987 (w/Jan Neckář)
 Rybičko zlatá, přeju si 1989
 Merilyn 1991
 Mží 1994 (w/Karel Gott)
 Ave Maria 1994 (w/Štefan Margita)
 Za každou chvíli s tebou platím 2000
 Je naprosto nezbytné 2000

2003 Hana Zagorová - Portréty Českých Hvězd (CD)
Areca
 Ta pusa je tvá 	
 Já se vznáším 	
 Hany 	
 Obraz smutný slečny 	
 Kouzelný obraz 	
 Já lásku znám 	
 Písnička v bílém 	
 Až nebudeš mě chtít 	
 Dinda 	
 Verbíř 	
 Život je loto 	
 Už nejsi můj milý 	
 Prý jsem zhýralá 	
 Flétnou tě přivolám 	
 Můj zůstaň

2003 Various Artists - Splněná Přání: Vánoční Album Hvězd (CD)
Supraphon
 Vánoční tajemství (w/Petr Rezek)
 Jen jedenkrát v roce

2004 Hana Zagorová - Sítě Kroků Tvých (CD)
Supraphon, total time: 73:51, SU 5519-2 311, AAD stereo
 Hej 1985
 Poslední z posledních 1985
 Nic jí neschází 1985 (w/Petr Kotvald, Stanislav Hložek)
 Noční dopis 1985
 Starosti 1985
 Sláva, je bál (Niech žyje bal) 1985
 Co mám ze své výhry 1985
 Maxitaxi 1985
 Nešlap, nelámej 1985
 Zločin století 1985
 Když svítím 1985
 Ztracená píseň 1985
 Sítě kroků tvých (Sulla tua pelle) 1985
 To jsi ty 1980
 Auťák na lásku 1983 (w/Petr Kotvald, Stanislav Hložek)
 Pátek (Tuesday) 1981
 Ty jsi jednoho dne přišel na můj práh 1980
 Rýmy 1980
 Já mám pár tónů 1976
 Telegram (Telegram) 1977
 Tak to jsem já (December 1963 - Oh What a Night) 1977
 Kdyby se vrátil čas 1979

2004 Various Artists - Nejkrásnější Dueta (CD)
Supraphon
 Dávné lásky (w/Karel Gott)
 Lásko, amore (w/Juraj Kukura)
 Ta pusa je tvá (w/Petr Rezek)
 Vyhrát se dá (w/Jiří Korn)

2004 Helena Vondráčková - Přelety (DVD)
Supraphon
 Dvě žlutá kuřátka (w/Helena Vondráčková)

2004 Hana Zagorová - Já Lásku Znám (CD)
 Ta pusa je tvá 	
 Já se vznáším 	
 Hany 	
 Obraz smutný slečny 	
 Kouzelný obraz 	
 Já lásku znám 	
 Písnička v bílém 	
 Až nebudeš mě chtít 	
 Dinda 	
 Verbíř 	
 Život je loto 	
 Už nejsi můj milý 	
 Prý jsem zhýralá 	
 Flétnou tě přivolám 	
 Můj zůstaň

2004 Various Artists - Nejkrásnější Česká Dueta (CD)
 Hej, mistře basů (Mr. Bass Man) 1983 (w/Karel Vágner)
 Ta pusa je tvá (Stumblin' in) 1979 (w/Petr Rezek)
 Duhová víla 1977 (w/Petr Rezek)

2004 Helena Vondráčková - Rendez-Vous (CD)
Universal Music
 Dvě žlutá kuřátka (w/Helena Vondráčková)

2004 Hana Zagorová - Biograf Láska (CD)
 Biograf láska
 Zdá se
 Maluj zase obrázky
 Duhová víla (w/Petr Rezek)
 Nešlap, nelámej
 Já se vznáším
 Usnul nám, spí
 Mys dobrých nadějí
 Je t'aime
 Kapky
 Když tě ztrácím
 Studánko stříbrná
 Zpráva všem holubům
 Přítel splín
 Cesta ke štěstí
 Já chtěla jsem ti báseň psát
 Dneska už to vím
 Zásnuby
 Sloky trochu smutné lásky

2004 Karel Gott - Lásko Má (CD)
Supraphon
 Dávné lásky (w/Karel Gott)

2004 Various Artists - Hitparáda 70. let (2CD)
Supraphon
 Ta pusa je tvá (w/Petr Rezek)
 Bludička Julie
 Maluj zase obrázky

2004 Various Artists - Hitparáda 80. let (2CD)
Supraphon
 Hej, mistře basů (w/Karel Vágner)
 Můj čas (w/Petr Kotvald, Stanislav Hložek)

2004 Various Artists - Zlaté Duety 2 (CD)
 Dvě žlutá kuřátka (w/Helena Vondráčková)
 Vánoční tajemství (w/Petr Rezek)

2004 Petr Kotvald, Stanislav Hložek - Holky z Naší Školky po 20ti Letech (CD)
Monitor
 Můj čas (Remix) (2004) (w/Petr Kotvald, Stanislav Hložek)

2005 Hana Zagorová - Náhlá Loučení (CD)
Supraphon, total time: 72:48, SU 5618-2 3, AAD stereo
 Náhlá loučení 1986
 Jako nemluvně 1986
 Já ti mávám 1986 (w/Karel Vágner)
 Druhá láska 1986
 Byl jsi tak jiný 1986
 Sbohem, dobrá firmo 1986
 Jízda 1986
 Neříkej mi 1986
 Láska na inzerát 1986
 Touhy 1986
 Tvá kočka 1986
 Už se mi nechce jít dál 1986
 Naše láska ztrácí L 1986
 Kousek cesty s tebou 1986
 Zas tu máme závěr léta (Non la puoi chiamare vita) 1987
 Poutník jménem život (Trzeba mi wielkej wody) 1982
 Proč ti na tom tak záleží (Mrs. Caroline Robinson) 1978
 Sliby, chyby (Funny, Funny) 1972
 Fata morgana 1972
 Kluk, na kterého múžu dát (Byla to glupia milosc) 1974
 Zima, zima, zima, zima 1975

2005 Various Artists - Ještě že Tě, Lásko, Mám (CD)
Supraphon, SU 5612-2 3
 Biograf láska

2005 Various Artists - Made in Italy (CD)
Supraphon, SU 5641-2 3
 Málokdo ví
 Jen pár dnů
 Polibek (w/Petr Kotvald, Stanislav Hložek)

2005 Various Artists - Kytice (2CD)
Supraphon, SU 5672-2 312
 Vodník
 Bludička

2006  Various Artists - Den, Kdy se Vrátí Láska (CD)
Supraphon, SU 5685-2 311
 Setkání (w/Drupi)

2006 Hana Zagorová - Živá Voda (CD)
Supraphon, total time: 73:58, SU 5687-2 311, AAD stereo
 Srážka s láskou 1987
 Větroplach 1987
 Už si nevzpomínám 1987
 S loudilem v patách 1987
 Skleněné sny 1987
 Chvíli jsem balónem 1987
 Bourá se dům 1987 (w/Jan Neckář)
 Drápkem se zachytím 1987
 Smiřování 1987
 Jako jindy 1987
 Zemětřesení 1987
 Velká krádež 1987
 Živá voda 1987
 Já se vznáším 1974
 Múj sen je touha žít (Vado via) 1976
 Byl to více než přítel múj 1976
 Svážu stuhou déšť 1975
 Asi, asi (Honey, Honey) 1975 (w/Petr Rezek)
 Kamarád 1975
 Přítel čas (All Grown Up) 1979
 Sám jsi šel 1977
 A v noci bude mráz 1976

2006 Karel Gott - Dnes / Country Album (2CD)
Supraphon
 Dávné lásky (w/Karel Gott)

2006 Damichi - Největší Italské Hity 4 (CD)
Sony BMG
 Setkání (2006) (w/Michal David, Damichi)

2006 Hana Zagorová - Zlatá Kolekce: Hana Zagorová - S úctou... (4CD)
Supraphon, total time: 299:51, SU 5688-2 314, AAD stereo

CD1
 Bludička Julie 1969
 Písnička v bílém 1968
 Obraz smutný slečny 1968
 Hany (Honey) 1969
 Tisíc nových jmen 1969
 Mrtvá láska 1969
 Černý pasažér 1969
 Prý jsem zhýralá (Chanson de Prevert) 1968
 Tanečnice 1970
 Budeš zase lhát 1970
 Gvendolína 1971
 Já jsem tvá neznámá 1971
 Sliby, chyby (Funny Funny) 1972
 Fata morgana 1973
 Náš dům zní smíchem (I´ve Found My Freedom) 1973
 Já znám ten balzám (Down By the River) 1974
 Já se vznáším 1974
 Breviář lásky 1975
 Kamarád 1975
 Dávám kabát na věšák 1975
 Já mám pár tónů 1976
 Zima, zima, zima, zima 1975

CD2
 Řeka zázraků 1976
 Opona stoupá 1976
 Maluj zase obrázky 1976
 Cesta ke štěstí 1976
 Vlaštovčí hnízdo 1976
 Studánko stříbrná 1976
 Málokdo ví (Sambario) 1977
 Duhová víla 1977 (w/Petr Rezek)
 Oheň a struny 1977
 Nevím 1978
 Máš svůj cíl (Good Bye, Joe) 1978
 Pěšky jít, nám je souzený (Couple Of Swells) 1977 (w/Jiří Korn)
 Zdá se 1978
 Kapky 1978
 Kdyby se vrátil čas 1979
 Ta pusa je tvá (Stumblin´ In) 1979 (w/Petr Rezek)
 Náskok (Hot Stuff) 1980
 Setkání 1980 (w/Drupi)
 Benjamin (Benžamin) 1980 (alternative version)
 Povídej si se mnou, abych neplakala 1980

CD3
 Líto je mi líto (Vendo tutto) 1980
 Usnul nám, spí 1980
 Dávné lásky 1980 (w/Karel Gott)
 Opona 1981
 Nápad (Everybody's Rockin´) 1982
 Sloky trochu smutné lásky 1982
 Biograf láska 1982
 Tak ty ses vrátil 1982
 Žízeň po životě 1982
 Spěchám (Queen Of Hearts) 1983 (w/Petr Kotvald, Stanislav Hložek)
 To by nebylo fér (I'll Find My Way Home) 1983 (w/Petr Kotvald, Stanislav Hložek)
 Vím málo (She's Always a Woman) 1983
 Hej, mistře basů (Mister Bass-Man) 1983 (w/Karel Vágner)
 Kam jdou (Hello) 1984
 Černý páv (Hard To Say I'm Sorry) 1983 (w/Petr Kotvald, Stanislav Hložek)
 Můj čas 1984 (w/Petr Kotvald, Stanislav Hložek)
 Nešlap, nelámej 1985
 Jen pár dnů (Cosa sei) 1984 (w/Vlastimil Harapes)
 Mys dobrých nadějí 1984
 Jinak to nejde (Guardian Angel) 1984 (w/Petr Kotvald, Stanislav Hložek)
 Sítě kroků tvých (Sur ta peau /Sulla tua pelle/) 1985

CD4
 Sláva je bál (Niech žyje bal) 1985 
 Náhlá loučení 1986
 Už se mi nechce jít dál 1986
 Srážka s láskou 1988
 Kousek cesty s tebou 1987
 Živá voda 1987
 Já nevím jak (I Don't Know Why) 1988 (w/Pavel Wožniak)
 Zemětřesení 1988
 Modrá čajovna 1989
 Rybičko zlatá, přeju si 1989
 Čas odejít 1990
 Beránek (Zabavki pana Boga) 1990
 Žena za tvými zády (Grande valse brillante) 1991
 Přijď aspoň na chvíli 1993 (w/Boris Rösner)
 Skanzen bídy 1990
 Jako starý strom 1991
 Mží 1991 (w/Karel Gott) 
 Rozhovor v tichu 1991
 Merilyn 2000 (alternative version)
 Ave Maria 1994 (w/Štefan Margita)

2006 Karel Gott - Kontrasty / ...a to mám rád (2CD)
Supraphon
 Apríl (w/Karel Gott)

2006 Hana Zagorová - Perly Hany Zagorové (2CD)
Multisonic

CD1
 Studánko stříbrná
 Je naprosto nezbytné
 Rybičko zlatá, přeju si
 Krev a šroubky
 Biograf láska
 Maluj zase obrázky
 Zůstaň tady léto
 Zásnuby
 Modrá čajovna
 Kdyby se vrátil čas
 Co stalo se, stalo
 Hej, mistře basů (Mr. Bass Man) (w/Karel Vágner)
 Moře samoty
 Duhová víla (w/Petr Rezek)
 Hany (Honey)
 Nešlap, nelámej
 Usnul nám, spí
 Jako starý strom
 Kapky
 Smůlu máš
 Rozhovor v Tichu

CD2
 Nápad (Everybody's Rockin')
 Mys dobrých nadějí
 Navěky zůstane pouze čas
 Zpráva všem holubům
 Gvendolína
 Sloky trochu smutné lásky
 Já se vznáším
 Dopis na rozloučenou
 Zdá se
 Cesta ke štěstí
 Jízda
 Žena za tvými zády
 Stíny
 Je tu doba dešťů
 Nebylo by, kdyby
 Tanečnice
 Blahovolně
 Blahovolně
 Málokdo ví
 Lásko vítej

2006 Various Artists - Boublík (CD)
Radioservis
 Jean
 Kočičí slabikář
 Motýlí žal
 Dům svalové ztuhlosti (w/Viktor Sodoma, Jiří Štědroň)

DVD

2004 Hana Zagorová - Cesta ke Štěstí (2DVD)
Supraphon

DVD1
 Úvod – Hana Zagorová 2004
 Bludička Julie 1970
 Svatej kluk 1969
 Jsou v blátivý cestě koleje (Wedrowanie) 1969
 Obraz smutný slečny 1970
 Mrtvá láska 1970
 Já jsem tvá neznámá 1972
 Gvendolína 1972
 Sliby-chyby (Funny, Funny) 1972
 Náš dům zní smíchem (I've Found my Freedom) 1973
 Kamarád 1975
 Benjamin 1981
 Studánko stříbrná 1976
 Cesta ke štěstí 1977
 Telegram (Telegram) 1978
 Nevím 1981
 Zdá se 1981
 Směs písní s Petrem Rezkem 1989 
 Ta pusa je tvá (Stumblin' in)
 Duhová víla
 Honey (Honey) 1981
 Dvě žlutá kuřátka (Piano Jack and Dixieland) 1978 (w/Helena Vondráčková)
 Málokdo ví (Sambario) 1978
 Setkání 1979 (w/Drupi)
 Povídej si se mnou, abych neplakala 1981
 Dávné lásky 1980 (w/Karel Gott)
 Kapky 1981
 Pěšky jít nám je souzený (Couple of Swells) 1977 (w/Jiří Korn)
 Můj den zítřejší (Out Here on my Own) 1983
 Láska je počasí 1983
 To by nebylo fér (I'll Find my Way Home) 1983 (w/Petr Kotvald, Stanislav Hložek)
 Biograf láska 1983
 Narozeniny 1983
 Tak ty ses vrátil 1983
 Hej, mistře basů (Mr. Bass Man) 1983 (w/ Karel Vágner)
 Rytmus 1982 (w/Petr Kotvald, Stanislav Hložek)
 Rýmy (Save me)
 Náš dům zní smíchem (I've Found my Freedom)
 Kosmický sen
 Já se vznáším
 Já jsem tvá neznámá
 Kamarád
 Duhová víla
 Nápad (Everybody's Rockin')
 Diskohrátky (The locomotion)
 Maják (To Love) 1984
 Kočičí píseň (The Old Gumbie Cat) 1983 (w/Petr Kotvald, Stanislav Hložek)
 Co stalo se, stalo 1984
 Maluj zase obrázky 1980
 Jinak to nejde (Guardian Angel) 1984 (w/Petr Kotvald, Stanislav Hložek)
 Pro dva tři úsměvy 1985 (w/Petr Kotvald, Stanislav Hložek)
 Džínovej kluk (Girls Just Want to Have Fun) 1984
 Kostky jsou vrženy (Monte Carlo is Great) 1983 (w/Petr Kotvald, Stanislav Hložek, VOX)
 Vím málo (She's Always a Woman) 1983
 Černý páv (Hard to Say I'm Sorry) 1983 (w/Petr Kotvald, Stanislav Hložek)
 Spěchám (Queen of Hearts) 1983 (w/Petr Kotvald, Stanislav Hložek)
 Kam jdou (Hello) 1984
 Řekni třikrát lásko 1984
 Vlaštovčí hnízdo 1984 (w/Karel Gott a Vlastimil Harapes)
 Mys dobrých nadějí 1984
 Náhlá loučení 1986
 Už se mi nechce jít dál 1986

DVD2
 Letní kluci (No me puedes dejar asi) 1985
 Sítě kroků tvých (Sulla tua pelle) 1985
 Nešlap, nelámej 1985
 Jen pár dnů (Cosa sei) 1985 (w/Vlastimil Harapes)
 Sláva, je bál (Niech žyje bal) 1985
 Já o něm vím své (I Know Him so Well) 1987 (w/Petra Janů)
 Srážka s láskou 1988
 Rybičko zlatá, přeju si 1989
 Živá voda 1988
 Čas odejít 1988
 Žena za tvými zády (Grande valse brillante) 1991
 Hra na pravdu 1993 (w/Dáša Veškrnová)
 Přijď aspoň na chvíli 1993 (w/Boris Rösner)
 Mží 1994 (w/Karel Gott)
 Den jako obrázek 1998 (w/Helena Růžičková)
 Ave Maria 1993 (w/Štefan Margita)
 Směs vánočních koled 1993 (w/Štefan Margita)
 Půjdem spolu do Betléma
 Nesem vám noviny
 Já bych rád k Betlému
 Narodil sa Kristus Pán
 Vánoční tajemství 2000 (w/Petr Rezek)
 Za každou chvíli s tebou platím 2000
 Beránek (Zabavki Pana Boga) 2000
 Kdyby se vrátil čas 2001
 Je naprosto nezbytné 2003
 Nápad (Everybody's Rockin') 2004
 BONUS: Diskografie Hany Zagorové
 BONUS: Biografie

Film and Television

1980: Trhák
Barrandov Studios, Comedy / Musical
 Director: Zdenek Podskalský
 Writers: Ladislav Smoljak, Zdenek Sverák
 International English title: "The Hit"
 Runtime: 94 min
 Country of origin: Czechoslovakia
 Language: Czech
 Color
 Cast: Hana Zagorová (Teacher Eliška), Josef Abrhám, Juraj Kukura, Waldemar Matuska, etc.
 Soundtrack includes: Žít je fajn, Znám křišťálovou studánku, Lásko, amore, etc.
 DVD released by Dividi in 2004

1981-86: Dluhy Hany Zagorové

1.díl: Dluhy Hany Zagorové 1981
 Láska v desátém semestru - Hana Zagorová
 Opona - Hana Zagorová
 Can I Reach You - Goldie Ens
 Take Me - Goldie Ens
 Kino Gloria - Petr Rezek
 Žentour - instrumental
 Tvůj parfém - Petr Rezek
 Na Blysk - Eva Kuklinska
 Diskohrátky - Hana Zagorová, Stanislav Hložek, I. Viktorin
 Dávné lásky - Hana Zagorová, Karel Gott
 Líto, je mi líto - Hana Zagorová
 Rýmy - Hana Zagorová
 Náskok - Hana Zagorová

2.díl: Dluhy Hany Zagorové: Malý Poetický Recitál z Máchova Kraje 1982
 Perný den - instrumental
 Oheň - Hana Zagorová
 Povídej si se mnou, abych neplakala - Hana Zagorová
 Unknown song - Buenaventura
 První snídaně - Petr Rezek
 Jaká jsem - instrumental
 Oh, Suzi - Petr Kotvald, Stanislav Hložek
 Kapky - Hana Zagorová
 He's So Shy - Hana Zagorová, Buenaventura
 Benjamin - Hana Zagorová
 Píseň lásky tlampač z dáli hrál - Hana Zagorová
 Perný den - instrumental

3.díl: Dluhy Hany Zagorové: Konkurs 1982
 Počítadlo lásky - Hana Zagorová, Petr Kotvald, Stanislav Hložek
 Skladby Hany Zagorové v podání účastnic konkurzu
 Mimořádná linka - Hana Zagorová
 skladba Příboj v podání vítěze konkurzu
 Kočičí píseň - Hana Zagorová, Petr Kotvald, Stanislav Hložek
 Vím málo - Hana Zagorová
 Vím málo - instrumental

4.díl: Dluhy Hany Zagorové: Světlo a Stín 1983
 Láska je počasí - Hana Zagorová
 Anonym - Hana Zagorová
 Tak ty ses vrátil - Hana Zagorová
 Stáří - Hana Zagorová
 Biograf láska - Hana Zagorová, Petr Kotvald, Stanislav Hložek
 Hej, taste! - Hana Zagorová, Petr Kotvald, Stanislav Hložek
 Valaki Gondol Rad - Rozo Soltezs
 Narozeniny - Hana Zagorová, Petr Kotvald, Stanislav Hložek, etc.
 Jako zlatý déšť - Hana Zagorová
 Sluníčko na houpačce - recitace Hany Zagorové

5.díl: Dluhy Hany Zagorové: Noc v Pasáži 1983
 Můj den zítřejší - Hana Zagorová
 To by nebylo fér - Hana Zagorová, Petr Kotvald, Stanislav Hložek
 Bílá královna - Petr Kotvald, Stanislav Hložek
 Hej, mistře basů - Hana Zagorová, Karel Vágner
 Szcesliwej drogi juz czas - VOX
 Noční zkouška - J. Satoranský, S. Budínová, Z. Podskalský, O. Schoberová
 Lovestory 2005 - Hana Zagorová, V. Preiss
 Dvě žlutá kuřátka - Hana Zagorová, sbor

6.díl: Dluhy Hany Zagorové: Pohádka z Karet 1984
 Řekni třikrát lásko - instrumental
 Snad zítra slunce nám vyjde - Hana Zagorová, Petr Kotvald, Stanislav Hložek
 Vzhůru mládenci - K.Gott, Jiří Korn, Vlastimil Harapes, Luboš Pospíšil
 Když jsou pohádky v nás - Jiří Korn
 Veřejný vítr - Luboš Pospíšil
 Řekni třikrát lásko - Hana Zagorová
 Vlaštovčí hnízdo - Hana Zagorová, Vlastimil Harapes, Karel Gott
 To musím zvládnout sám - Karel Gott
 Mys dobrých nadějí - Hana Zagorová
 Vzhůru mládenci - Hana Zagorová, Petr Kotvald, Stanislav Hložek, Karel Gott, Jiří Korn, Vlastimil Harapes, Luboš Pospíšil

7.díl: Dluhy Hany Zagorové: Na Chmelu 1984
 Ahoj, léto - Hana Zagorová, Petr Kotvald, Stanislav Hložek
 Průšvih - Petr Kotvald, Stanislav Hložek
 Dívka, co sama chodí spát - Petr Kotvald, Stanislav Hložek
 Kam jdou - Hana Zagorová
 Džínovej kluk - Hana Zagorová, Petr Kotvald, Stanislav Hložek
 Už dlouho se mi zdáš - Hana Zagorová
 Dneska už to vím - Hana Zagorová
 Co stalo se stalo - Hana Zagorová
 V průvanu - Hana Zagorová, Petr Kotvald, Stanislav Hložek
 Milenci v texaskách, Kdyby sis oči vyplakala, Život je bílý dům, Den je krásný - Hana Zagorová, Petr Kotvald, Stanislav Hložek
 Jinak to nejde - Hana Zagorová, Petr Kotvald, Stanislav Hložek

8.díl: Dluhy Hany Zagorové: Hvězdná Pout 1985
 Zlato - Hana Zagorová
 Letní kluci - Hana Zagorová
 Pro dva tři úsměvy - Hana Zagorová, Petr Kotvald, Stanislav Hložek
 Když svítím - Hana Zagorová
 Dnes je prima den - sbor
 Kontakt - Hana Zagorová, Petr Kotvald, Stanislav Hložek
 Sítě kroků tvých - Hana Zagorová

2005: Hrubeš a Mareš Jsou Kamarádi do Deště
CinemArt, Comedy / Drama
 Production Companies: Ateliers Zlín, První Verejnoprávní
 Country: Czech Republic
 Director: Vladimír Morávek
 Writers: Jan Budar, Vladimír Morávek
 Language: Czech
 Color
 Cast: Hana Zagorová (Herself), Jan Budar, Richard Krajco, Miroslav Donutil, etc.
 Sound Mix: Dolby Digital
 Ratings: Czech/15
 Filming Started: November 3, 2004
 Release Date: October 13, 2005
 Screen Count for Week #1: 26 Screens
 Box Office: 13 October 2005: CZK 1,268,699 (Czech Republic)
 Box Office: 20 October 2005: CZK 2,873,551 (Czech Republic)
 Box Office: 27 October 2005: CZK 4,170,929 (Czech Republic)
 Box Office: 3 November 2005: CZK 4,948,512 (Czech Republic)

Collaborations

Petr Kotvald, Stanislav Hložek
 Ahoj, léto 1984
 Auťák na lásku 1983
 Buldok (Ping Pong) 1983
 Černý páv (Hard to Say I'm Sorry) 1983
 Dneska už to vím 1984
 Hej, taste (Mickey) 1983
 Hotel Avion 1984
 Jen jedenkrát v roce (Einmal im Winter) 1986
 Jinak to nejde (Guardian Angel) 1984
 Kočičí píseň (The Old Gumbie Cat) 1981
 Koncert 1983
 Kontakt 1987
 Kostky jsou vrženy (Monte Carlo is Great) 1983
 Love Car (Auťák na lásku) 1986
 Modrý ostrov snů 1983
 Můj čas 1984
 My time (Můj čas) 1986
 Nic jí neschází 1985
 Polibek (Piccolo amore) 1984
 Potulní kejklíři 1985
 Pro dva tři úsměvy 1985
 Queen of Hearts (Spěchám) 1985
 Silly Song
 Skála 1984
 Snad zítra slunce nám vyjde 1984
 Spěchám (Queen of Hearts) 1982
 Starci na chmelu 1986 
 Milenci v texaskách
 Kdyby sis oči vyplakala
 Život je bílý dům
 Den je krásný
 Stvořená k lásce 1984
 To by nebylo fér (I'll Find my Way Home) 1983
 Tu, tu 1986
 Ty nejsi zralý (Rosie) 1982
 V průvanu 1984

Petr Kotvald, Stanislav Hložek (uncredited)
 Co ti brání v pousmání 1984
 Máj je máj 1984
 Počítadlo lásky 1982

Stanislav Hložek
 Kluk z příštího století (Almost Paradise) 1984
 Slušných lidí je víc 1987
 Tam, kde schází terminál 1986
 Udělej si prima den 1987
 Velikánský umění 1986

Petr Rezek
 Asi, asi (Honey, Honey) 1975
 Dotazník (Rock Bottom) 1978
 Duhová víla 1977
 Rainbow fairy (Duhová víla) 1979
 Ta pusa je tvá (Stumblin´ In) 1979
 Vánoční tajemství 1977
 Zákaz předjíždění 1981

Karel Gott
 Apríl 1983
 Co já vím 1985
 Dávné lásky 1980
 Mží 1994

References

External links
 Official site - http://zagorovahana.cz/
 Unofficial site - http://hanazagorova.mzf.cz/
 

Pop music discographies